The 1907 Montana football team represented the University of Montana in the 1907 college football season. They were led by first-year head coach Albion Findlay, and finished the season with a record of four wins, one loss and one tie (4–1–1).

Schedule

References

Montana
Montana Grizzlies football seasons
Montana football